Magical Girl (titled La niña de fuego in France) is a 2014 neo-noir film written and directed by Carlos Vermut, and starring Bárbara Lennie, Luis Bermejo and José Sacristán. The plot tracks the events unraveling upon the decision of a father (Bermejo) to fulfill the secret wish of his dying 12-year-old otaku daughter (Pollán).

The film made its world premiere at the 39th Toronto International Film Festival in September 2014, also screening at the 62nd San Sebastián International Film Festival, where it scooped the Golden Shell and the Silver Shell. Lennie won the Goya Award for Best Actress for her performance. It is a Spanish-French co-production.

Plot 
A maths teacher reprimands a student named Bárbara for a note she purportedly wrote. After insulting the teacher, Bárbara plays a handtrick illusion on the teacher with the note.

A girl dancing to the sound of Japanese music faints in her bedroom. A man sells his belongings (books) at a used goods store and looks with interest at a jewelry store's display window, later arriving home to find the former girl, Alicia, lying unconscious on the floor. Back home from the hospital, the man (Luis, Alicia's father), grants Alicia (known as Yukiko in her otaku circle) a number of wishes. Upon reading Alicia's diary, Luis commits to gifting Alicia a Magical Girl Yukiko costume costing €6,845, and asks a bar owner (Marisol) for money in order to satisfy the secret wish of her 12-year-old daughter Alicia (sick with leukemia). A desperate Luis decides to break the aforementioned shop window glass, but vomit falls on him from above just before breaking it.

A man and a woman (Bárbara) discuss in their bedroom, after which Bárbara pretends to ingest her medication. After taking a friends' baby in her arms, Bárbara jokes with throwing the baby out of the window. Bárbara wakes up at night and hurts her forehead with a mirror. After ingesting alcohol and pills, she vomits out the window on Luis, and invites him to her appartment so he can take a shower. Upon learning that Bárbara's husband is a rich psychiatrist and after presenting himself as an unemployed literature teacher named Pedro, Luis has sex with Bárbara.

After claiming to have recorded them having sex with his phone, Luis blackmails Bárbara into getting him €7,000, threatening her with telling her husband. Bárbara asks a madam named Ada for money, offering to prostitute herself, thereby getting a one-time job without penetration at Óliver Zoco's residence. Taken to a remote mansion by a chauffeur-driven car, Bárbara is asked there to remove her clothes and to  remember a BDSM safeword ('hojalata') before entering a room. Luis asks Bárbara to leave the money inside a Spanish Constitution book hosted in a public library near Puerta de Toledo. After gifting the dress to Alicia, Luis finds out that the set is missing the scepter, sold as an add-on. Luis then blackmails Bárbara again into giving him another €20,000. Bárbara offers to do a job behind Óliver's black lizard door, where unspeakable things are done, discouragement by Ada notwithstanding.

Introduced as Damián, the teacher from the opening scene (now an old man) does not want to leave prison, because he is afraid of seeing Bárbara again. Damián finds a badly wounded Bárbara lying on the stairs of his appartment and takes her in, calling an ambulance. Bárbara asks Damián to leave the Constitution in the public library. Bárbara's husband, introduced as Alfredo, thanks Damián for taking care of his wife. At the hospital, Bárbara falsely suggests Damián that she has been raped by her blackmailer. After obtaining a gun, Damián follows Luis into a bar, introduces to him as a man sent to prison for having helped Bárbara, and provides Luis with the gun so he can kill him in plain sight, threatening with killing Luis' family otherwise. Failing to believe's Luis' version of the events and convinced that Luis raped Bárbara, Damián kills Luis and the two other witnesses at the bar. Damián goes to Luis appartment to look for the latter's phone, meeting Alicia, fully dressed with the Yukiko Magical Girl dress and holding the scepter. Damián shoots her.

Damián visits Bárbara and tells her that he has taken care of everything, playing on her the same trick with the phone that she played on him with the note years ago.

Cast

Influences on the film
Carlos Vermut had stated that the film bears the influence influenced of the popular dark magical girl  anime Puella Magi Madoka Magica. Carlos stated he liked the story in Madoka and that "[he] received inspiration from the dark part of [....] "Madoka Magica", not just imitating, but matching it with the image I was thinking and putting it in Magical Girl."

Production 
A co-production among Spain and France (90%–10%), Magical Girl was produced by Aquí y Allí Films, with the participation of Films Distribution, Sabre Producciones, TVE and Canal+.

Release 
The film was screened at the 2014 Toronto International Film Festival and the 2014 San Sebastián International Film Festival, where it won the Golden Shell. Distributed by Avalon, it was theatrically released in Spain on 17 October 2014. It opened in French theatres on 12 August 2015, under the title La niña de fuego.

Reception 
On the review aggregator Rotten Tomatoes, 100% of 8 reviews are positive, with an average rating of 9.0/10.

Jonathan Holland of The Hollywood Reporter considered the film to be "a spare, austere and thoroughly contemporary noirish social critique constructed on rich emotional foundation".

Peter Debruge of Variety considered the lack of relatable human behavior the film, "an elaborately contrived, imagination-dependent dark comedy", to be both an asset and a weakness.

Accolades

|-
| align = "center" rowspan = "2" | 2014 || rowspan=2 | 62nd San Sebastián International Film Festival
| colspan=2 | Golden Shell for Best Film
|  || rowspan = "2" | 
|-
| Silver Shell for Best Director
| Carlos Vermut
| 
|-
| rowspan = "20" align = "center" | 2015 || rowspan = "3" | 20th Forqué Awards || colspan = "2" | Best Fiction Picture ||  || rowspan = "3" | 
|-
| Best Actress || Bárbara Lennie || 
|-
| Best Actor || José Sacristán || 
|-
| rowspan=8 | 2nd Feroz Awards
| colspan=2 | Best Drama Film
|  || rowspan = "8" | 
|-
| Best Director
| Carlos Vermut
| 
|-
| Best Screenplay
| Carlos Vermut
| 
|-
| Best Main Actor
| Luis Bermejo
| 
|-
| Best Main Actress
| Bárbara Lennie
| 
|-
| Best Supporting Actor
| José Sacristán
| 
|-
| colspan=2 | Best Trailer
| 
|-
| colspan=2 | Best Film Poster
| 
|-
| 7th Gaudí Awards || colspan = "2" | Best European Film ||  ||  
|-
| rowspan=8 | 29th Goya Awards
| colspan=2 | Best Film
|  || rowspan = "8" | 
|-
| Best Director
| Carlos Vermut
| 
|-
| Best Original Screenplay
| Carlos Vermut
| 
|-
| Best Actor
| Luis Bermejo
| 
|-
| Best Actress
| Bárbara Lennie
| 
|-
| Best Supporting Actor
| José Sacristán
| 
|-
| Best New Actor
| Israel Elejalde
| 
|-
|}

See also 
 List of Spanish films of 2014

References

External links
 
 

2014 films
2014 thriller drama films
2010s French films
2010s Spanish films
2010s Spanish-language films
Aquí y Allí Films films
Films about father–daughter relationships
Films set in Madrid
Films shot in Madrid
French neo-noir films
French thriller drama films
Magical girl films
Spanish neo-noir films
Spanish thriller drama films
Spanish-language French films